San Giovanni decollato (or San Giovanni Battista Decollato) is Italian for "the beheaded Saint John" (Saint John the Baptist)  

It was a common subject in art until the 18th century, and may also refer to:

Churches
 San Giovanni Battista Decollato, a church in Rome controlled by Florence, attached to the "Oratory of San Giovanni Decollato".
 San Giovanni Decollato, Pistoia
 San Giovanni Battista Decollato, Dosimo
 San Giovanni Battista Decollato, Montemurlo
 San Zan Degola, Venice (name in Venetian dialect)

Art
The subject in art was John's head on a platter, especially popular in the later Middle Ages in various media. An example is:
 Head of Saint John the Baptist (Auguste Rodin)

Other
 San Giovanni decollato, an Italian comedy film of 1940, in English Saint John, the Beheaded